Kirua Vunjo Mashariki is a town and ward in the Moshi Rural district of the Kilimanjaro Region of Tanzania. Its population according to the 2012 census was 8,657.

References

Wards of Kilimanjaro Region